The 2019 Asian Table Tennis Championships were held in Yogyakarta, Indonesia from 15 to 22 September 2019. Around 128 males and 100 females table tennis players competed in the singles, doubles and team events.

Schedule
Five individual and two team events were contested.

Participating

Participating nations

 Afghanistan (3)
 Bangladesh (6)
 Bahrain (4)
 China (10)
 Hong Kong (10)
 Indonesia (10)
 India (10)
 Iran (8)
 Iraq (3)
 Jordan (7)
 Japan (10)
 Kazakhstan (6)
 Kuwait (4)
 Kyrgyzstan (3)
 Lebanon (6)
 Macau (8)
 Malaysia (8)
 Maldives (4)
 Mongolia (9)
 Nepal (6)
 North Korea (9)
 Palestine (3)
 Philippines (10)
 Saudi Arabia (4)
 Singapore (10)
 South Korea (10)
 Sri Lanka (8)
 Thailand (9)
 Turkmenistan (7)
 Chinese Taipei (11)
 United Arab Emirates (4)
 Uzbekistan (8)

Medal summary

Medal table

Events

See also
2019 ITTF-ATTU Asian Cup

References

Asian Table Tennis Championships
Asian Table Tennis Championships
Table Tennis Championships
Asian Table Tennis Championships
Table tennis competitions in Indonesia
Asian Table Tennis Championships